Leonid Anatolievich Bazan (born June 11, 1985 in Vinogradovka, Odessa Oblast, Ukrainian SSR, USSR) is an amateur Ukrainian-born Ukrainian, and later, Bulgarian freestyle wrestler.

He competed in the men's wrestling weight classes in the range from 66 to 74 kg.

Bazan competed for Ukraine in the wrestling competition (66 kg) for the World Cup (2007). Having moved to Varna, Bulgaria (2010), he won two silver medals in his division at the 2011 European Wrestling Championships in Dortmund, Germany, and at the 2012 European Wrestling Championships in Belgrade, Serbia. He is also a member of Chernomorskyj Sokol Wrestling Club in Varna, and is coached and trained by Simeon Shterev.

Bazan represented his adopted nation Bulgaria at the 2012 Summer Olympics in London, where he competed in the men's 66 kg class. He received a bye for the preliminary round of sixteen, before losing out to Azerbaijan's Jabrayil Hasanov, who was able to score three points each in two straight periods, leaving Bazan with a single point.

References

External links
Profile – International Wrestling Database
NBC Olympics Profile

1985 births
Living people
Olympic wrestlers of Bulgaria
Wrestlers at the 2012 Summer Olympics
People from Vynohradiv
Ukrainian emigrants to Bulgaria
Bulgarian male sport wrestlers
Sportspeople from Zakarpattia Oblast